The Rural Municipality of Paynton No. 470 is a rural municipality (RM) in the Canadian province of Saskatchewan within Census Division No. 17 and  Division No. 6. It is located in the northwest-central portion of the province.

History 
The RM of Paynton No. 470 incorporated as a rural municipality on January 1, 1913.

Geography

Communities and localities 
The following urban municipalities are surrounded by the RM.

Villages
Paynton

The following unincorporated communities are within the RM.

Localities
Bresaylor

Demographics 

Government 
The RM of Paynton No. 470 is governed by an elected municipal council and an appointed administrator that meets on the second Wednesday of every month. The reeve of the RM is Kevin Garrett while its administrator is Michelle Buechler. The RM's office is located in Paynton.

References 

P

Division No. 17, Saskatchewan